Holčíkovce is a village and municipality in Vranov nad Topľou District in the Prešov Region of eastern Slovakia.

History
In historical records the village was first mentioned in 1408.

Geography
The municipality lies at an altitude of 165 metres and covers an area of 12.546 km². It has a population of about 464 people.

Genealogical resources
The records for genealogical research are available at the state archive "Statny Archiv in Presov, Slovakia"
 Roman Catholic church records (births/marriages/deaths): 1788-1895 (parish B)
 Greek Catholic church records (births/marriages/deaths): 1802-1895 (parish B)

See also
 List of municipalities and towns in Slovakia

References

External links
 
 
Surnames of living people in Holcikovce

Villages and municipalities in Vranov nad Topľou District
Zemplín (region)